Valley Transit is a public transit operator in Walla Walla County, Washington. It operates 10 routes in the cities of Walla Walla and College Place.

History

Valley Transit was founded as the Walla Walla County Public Transportation Benefit Area in 1979, becoming the county's public transportation benefit area. A 0.3 percent sales tax was approved by voters on March 18, 1980, allowing for service to begin on January 5, 1981. In its first year of operation, the system carried 435,500 passengers.

Until 1997, Valley Transit operated an intercity route to Milton-Freewater, Oregon, through an intergovernmental agreement; it has since been replaced by a bus operated by the city government of Milton-Freewater.

On February 9, 2010, a 0.3 percent increase in sales tax was approved by 76 percent of voters to fund existing service and prevent service cuts.

Routes

Valley Transit operates 10 routes, operating from Monday to Saturday; on weekdays, normal services run from 6:15 a.m. to 5:45 p.m., while two "flex" routes operate from 5:50 p.m. to 9:10 p.m. on weekday evenings and 10:45 a.m. to 6:10 p.m on Saturdays.

Route 1 (Mainline): Wal-Mart to Walla Walla Community College via Rose Street and Isaacs Avenue, Downtown Transfer Center, Whitman College
Route 2 (College Place Ciculator): Wal-Mart to Walla Walla University
Route 3 (2nd Avenue/Wa-Hi): Downtown Transfer Center to Walla Walla High School via Walla Walla General Hospital
Route 4 (Melrose/Alder): Downtown Transfer Center to K-Mart via Alder Street and Melrose Street
Route 5 (Fairgrounds): Downtown Transfer Center to Plaza Shopping Center/Walla Walla County Fairgrounds via 9th Avenue
Route 6 (VA/Medical Loop): Downtown Transfer Center to Fort Walla Walla, VA Hospital
Route 7 (Pleasant Street Loop): Downtown Transfer Center to Pioneer Park
Route 9 (Pine Street Loop): Downtown Transfer Center to Washington State Penitentiary
East Loop (Flex): Downtown Transfer Center to Walla Walla Community College via Melrose Street, isaacs Avenue, Alder Street
West Loop (Flex): Downtown Transfer Center to Wal-Mart via Rose Street, College Avenue, Dalles Military Road

Intercity connections

Valley Transit connects to several intercity bus routes, operated by agencies, at the Walla Walla Transit Center in downtown Walla Walla:

Travel Washington's Grape Line, operating 3 daily round trips to Pasco
Kayak Public Transit, operated by the Confederated Tribes of the Umatilla Indian Reservation
Milton-Freewater Bus to Milton-Freewater, Oregon
Columbia County Public Transportation to Dayton and Prescott

Fares

Valley Transit charges a 50-cent fare on its routes for passengers aged 5 years or older; those under 5, up to 3 per fare-paying rider, ride for free. Monthly passes and ticket books are also offered.

During the summer months, Valley Transit runs fare-free to encourage newcomers to try the system.

References

External links

Bus transportation in Washington (state)
Transit agencies in Washington (state)
Transportation in Walla Walla County, Washington